The Special Forces of Azerbaijan is a military unit of the Republic of Azerbaijan.

History
It was established in April 1999 under the Ministry of Defense. The formation of the unit was attended by officers and warrant officers who participated in the First Nagorno-Karabakh War of 1991–1994. The Turkish Special Forces Command played a special role in the formation of the Azerbaijani special forces. On 29 April 2015, in commemoration of the 16th anniversary of their formation a ceremony of presenting battle flags to the newly created special forces units took place. On 26 June 2018, a military parade was held in Baku on the occasion of the 100th anniversary of the Armed Forces of Azerbaijan, with the formation from the Special Forces being led by General Hikmet Mirzaev. On 20 June 2020, a new Special Forces unit was created. In late July and early August of that year, a series of large-scale tactical joint Azerbaijani-Turkish exercises took place on the territory of Azerbaijan, in the first stage of which units of the Azerbaijani Special Forces were also involved.

Battles and wars
During the 2020 Nagorno-Karabakh War, personnel of the Special Forces reclaimed the city of Jebrayil and nine surrounding villages from the Armenian Armed Forces. On November 8, Aliyev congratulated the commander of the Special Forces on their "liberation of Shusha". Many of the tactical victory in the war were attributed to "saboteur groups" from the Special Forces that provided target coordinates from their positions on the ground as well as entered the city and pushed the Armenian Army out from the city center. The war was considered to be first time Azerbaijan has actively used all of its special forces units.

Typically 30 out of 500 candidates earn the "Maroon beret" certificate. Cadets are taught to survive and execute their mission, even if they are hungry and thirsty for days. They are taught to eat whatever they find, such as frogs and snakes. They receive weapons training covering firearms and explosives. Officers operate under the rank of ensign.

Equipment
 Zafer P
 Inam
 Glock 19
 Heckler & Koch MP5
 IMI Uzi
 Aztex AR-15
 M4 carbine
 M16 rifle
 Heckler & Koch G36
 SIG SG 550
 IWI Tavor X95
 IMI Tavor TAR-21
 MPT-76

Notable personnel
Murad Mirzayev
Samid Imanov
Zaur Mammadov
Anar Aliyev

Gallery

See also
Azerbaijani Armed Forces

References

External links
The Special Forces of Azərbaijan

Special forces of Azerbaijan
Military units and formations of Azerbaijan
Azerbaijan